Ralstonia mannitolilytica is a Gram-negative soil bacterium. Pseudomonas thomasii and Ralstonia pickettii biovar  are synonyms.

Ralstonia mannitolilytica has been implicated as an opportunistic pathogen in hospital-acquired infections, including a 1976 United Kingdom outbreak due to a contaminated distilled water supply, a 1989 outbreak in Taiwan caused by contaminated 0.9% sodium chloride solution, and a 2005 outbreak in children in the United States that was linked to contaminated Vapotherm respiratory gas humidification devices.

References

External links
 Genera Ralstonia at J.P. Euzéby: List of Prokaryotic names with Standing in Nomenclature
Type strain of Ralstonia mannitolilytica at BacDive -  the Bacterial Diversity Metadatabase

Burkholderiaceae
Bacteria described in 2001